Alton Downs Station, most commonly known simply as Alton Downs, is a pastoral lease that operates as a cattle station in north east South Australia.

 north west of Innamincka. It is bordered to the west by the Simpson Desert Regional reserve, to the south by Clifton Hills Station and to the east by Pandie Pandie Station. The station contains many landforms including gibber plains, sand-plains, floodplains, channels and ephemeral rivers. The Warburton River flows through the property southward through Clifton Hills and Cowarie Station then discharging into Lake Eyre.

History 
The property was first taken up by Whittingham in 1878, the same year that Chapman established Cordillo Downs Station. Whittington still owned the property in 1893 but was experiencing financial difficulties with the Bank of Adelaide, of which he was a director.

Sidney Kidman acquired the property in 1897 after he had bought nearby Cowarie Station and about the same time he started to expand further into the Channel Country and purchased Annandale Station.

The station was abandoned sometime early in the 1900s when the area was drought struck. Other nearby properties including Pandie Pandie, Miranda and Idra Downs had also been abandoned. The country had started to recover from the drought in 1904 and pastoralists in the area had commenced restocking.

The property was found to be practically abandoned in 1927 after the area had been over run by rabbits.

Current use 
The property is currently owned by Brook Proprietors, who also own nearby Cordillo Downs, Murnpeowie, Adria Downs (Queensland) and Kamaran Downs (Queensland) stations. All these holdings are NASAA Certified Organic Livestock operations.

The land occupying the extent of the Alton Downs pastoral lease was gazetted as a locality in April 2013 under the name 'Alton Downs Station' with the word 'Station' being added to avoid duplication of the name of a locality in Queensland.

See also
List of ranches and stations

References

Stations (Australian agriculture)
Pastoral leases in South Australia
Far North (South Australia)
1878 establishments in Australia